Burgula Ramakrishna Rao (13 March 1899 – 15 September 1967) was the second and last Chief Minister of the erstwhile Hyderabad State. Prior to the independence of India and the political integration of the princely states into the Union, he was among the Telugu-speaking leaders to resist the Nizam in the princely state of Hyderabad.
He was a multi lingual academic, known for his scholarship in Sanskrit and Telugu. He was also a poet and translator ( his works may be cited).

Career

He received famous “Allies” scholarship and graduated in law in Mumbai and took up the legal profession in Hyderabad but continued for a few days only.  He was imprisoned twice for participating in public movements. He gave up the law portfolio given by Mirza Ismail, the Dewan (Prime Minister) of Hyderabad State.

He was one of the founding members of the Hyderabad State Congress. He presided over the second Andhra Mahasabha conference at Devarkonda in 1932 and gave direction for Telangana society. He also worked as a secretary for Hyderabad Swadesi League and Nizam Subjects League. He was also involved in promoting the library movement in the State.

He worked as a Revenue Minister in the cabinet of Vellodi government (1950) which was formed after police action. He got victory from Shadnagar constituency in the first sovereign elections held in 1952, and became the first Chief Minister of Hyderabad. After the termination of Nizam rule, in a short period he formed a stable democratic system with his administrative skill. He eradicated the system of jagirdar and mukthedar in Telangana and introduced the law of tenancy and became the first Indian land reformer.

The services of Burgula spread not only in Telangana but also to neighbouring areas. After the formation of Andhra Pradesh in 1956, as a Governor of Kerala state, he showed his statesmanship and got acclaim from many top politicians. When he was Governor of Uttar Pradesh, he was elected as a member of Rajya Sabha in 1962 to 1966.

From November 1956 to July 1960, Dr. Ramakrishna Rao was the Governor of Kerala, and in July 1959 he dismissed the first elected Communist govt. in India, the first time article 356 was used in India. Later he was Governor of Uttar Pradesh till April 1962. He was later elected to the Rajya Sabha in which he served from 1962 to 1966. He died on 14 September 1967.

Personal life
Burgula Ramakrishna Rao was married firstly to Smt. Radha Bai and later to Mrs. Ananthalakshmi Devi and is survived by his son,  Burgula Lakshmi Narayana Rao. His parents were Sri Narsing Rao and Mrs. Ranganayakamma and his younger brother was the late Sri Venkateshwara Rao.

See also
 1951–52 elections in India
 List of Chief Ministers of Andhra Pradesh
 List of chief ministers of Telangana

References

External links

http://www.teluguwebsite.com/Telugu_Pramukhaandhrulu.html
Indian states after 1947 A-L
http://burgulafamily.webs.com/
http://www.thehansindia.com/posts/index/Hans/2013-09-19/The-role-of-Burgula-in-Telangana/72201
https://web.archive.org/web/20161220121445/http://historyawareness.blogspot.in/2015/04/the-role-of-andhra-mahasabha-in.html

People from Hyderabad State
Telangana politicians
People from Mahbubnagar district
1899 births
1967 deaths
Politicians from Hyderabad, India
Chief ministers from Indian National Congress